This is the List of members of the Lok Sabha, representing from Rajasthan. These lower house members of the Indian Parliament were elected Indian general election.

17th Lok Sabha 
List of members (17 June 2019 – 16 June 2024) representation in Lok Sabha. These members of the Lower house of the Indian Parliament were elected in the 2019 Indian general election held in April–May 2019.
Keys:

16th Lok Sabha 
Keys:

15th Lok Sabha

Keys:

14th Lok Sabha 
Keys:

13th Lok Sabha
Keys;

12th Lok Sabha

11th Lok Sabha

10th Lok Sabha

9th Lok Sabha

8th Lok Sabha

7th Lok Sabha

6th Lok Sabha

5th Lok Sabha

4th Lok Sabha

3rd Lok Sabha

References 

Lok Sabha constituencies in Rajasthan